Rate  or rates may refer to:

Finance
 Rates (tax), a type of taxation system in the United Kingdom used to fund local government
 Exchange rate, rate at which one currency will be exchanged for another

Mathematics and science
 Rate (mathematics), a specific kind of ratio, in which two measurements are related to each other (often with respect to time)
 Rate function, a function used to quantify the probabilities of a rare event
 Reaction rate, in chemistry the speed at which reactants are converted into products

Military
 Naval rate, a junior enlisted member of a navy
 Rating system of the Royal Navy, a former method of indicating a British warship's firepower

People
 Ed Rate (1899–1990), American football player
 José Carlos Rates (1879–1945), General Secretary of the Portuguese Communist Party
 Peter of Rates (died 60 AD), traditionally considered to be the first bishop of Braga

Other uses
 Rate (building), the class of a building in late Georgian and early Victorian construction standards
 Rates (Póvoa de Varzim), a Portuguese parish and town located in the municipality of Póvoa de Varzim
 RATE project, a young earth creationism research project

See also
 
 
 Rate of change (disambiguation)
 Rating (disambiguation)
 Ratio (disambiguation)